John Brooks Henderson (November 16, 1826April 12, 1913) was a United States senator from Missouri and a co-author of the Thirteenth Amendment to the United States Constitution. For his role in the investigation of the Whiskey Ring, he was considered the first special prosecutor.

Early life
Born near Danville, Virginia, he moved with his parents to Lincoln County, Missouri, studied on his own while a farm hand, taught school, was admitted to the bar in 1844, and practiced.

Political career
Henderson was a member of the Missouri House of Representatives in 1848-1850 and 1856–1858, and was active in Democratic politics.  He was commissioned a brigadier general in the Missouri State Militia in 1861, commanding federal forces in northeast Missouri.

On January 17, 1862 Henderson was appointed to the U.S. Senate as a Unionist to fill the vacancy caused by the expulsion of Trusten Polk.  Later that year, Henderson was elected to a full six-year term in the U.S. Senate.

13th Amendment
As a United States Senator representing a slave state, Henderson co-authored and co-sponsored the Thirteenth Amendment to the United States Constitution permanently prohibiting slavery in the United States.  Henderson's original proposal, made January 11, 1864, was submitted to the Senate Judiciary Committee, and on February 10, 1864, it presented the Senate with a proposal combining the drafts of congressmen James Mitchell Ashley (Republican, Ohio), James Falconer Wilson, (Republican, Iowa), Charles Sumner (Republican, Massachusetts), and Henderson.

On January 31, 1865, the 13th Amendment was approved by the U.S. Congress, and on February 1, 1865, it was signed by President Abraham Lincoln.  On April 14, 1865, Lincoln was assassinated before the amendment was ratified by the State of Georgia on December 6, 1865.

While in the Senate, Henderson was chairman of the Committee to Audit and Control the Contingent Expense (Thirty-ninth Congress) and a member of the Committee on Indian Affairs (Thirty-ninth and Fortieth Congresses).

During President Andrew Johnson's impeachment trial, Henderson broke party ranks, along with nine other Republican senators and voted for acquittal. Among them, seven Republican senators were disturbed by how the proceedings had been manipulated in order to give a one-sided presentation of the evidence. In addition to Henderson, the other senators expressing those concerns were Senators William Pitt Fessenden, Joseph S. Fowler, James W. Grimes, Lyman Trumbull, Peter G. Van Winkle, and Edmund G. Ross of Kansas, who provided the decisive vote, defied their party and public opinion and voted against conviction. The other three Republican senators to vote against convicting Johnson were James Dixon, James Rood Doolittle, Daniel Sheldon Norton After the trial, Congressman Benjamin Butler conducted hearings on the widespread reports that Republican senators had been bribed to vote for Johnson's acquittal. In Butler's hearings, and in subsequent inquiries, there was increasing evidence that some acquittal votes were acquired by promises of patronage jobs and cash cards.

Henderson was not a candidate for reelection to the Senate in 1868 and left the U.S. Senate on March 3, 1869.

Henderson was an unsuccessful candidate for Governor of Missouri and later U.S. Senator.  In 1875, he was appointed by Ulysses Grant as a special United States attorney for prosecution of the Whiskey Ring at St. Louis. After attempting to stifle Henderson's investigation of the president's personal secretary, Grant fired Henderson on the basis that Henderson's statements to a grand jury regarding Grant were impertinent. Following criticism, Grant appointed a new special prosecutor, James Broadhead, to continue the investigation. In 1877, Henderson was appointed a commissioner to treat with hostile tribes of Indians.

Later life
Henderson moved to Washington, D.C. in 1888, was a writer, and resided in the capital until his death in 1913. Interment was in Green-Wood Cemetery, Brooklyn, New York.

Notes

References

External links

1826 births
1913 deaths
Burials at Green-Wood Cemetery
Politicians from Danville, Virginia
Members of the Missouri House of Representatives
Missouri lawyers
People from Lincoln County, Missouri
People of Missouri in the American Civil War
Missouri Democrats
Missouri Unionists
Missouri Unconditional Unionists
Missouri Republicans
Unionist Party United States senators
Republican Party United States senators from Missouri
Special prosecutors
Foote family